Fredric Fendrich (born 27 January 1988) is a Swedish footballer who played as a midfielder for Jönköpings Södra his entire career.

Career

Fendrich started his career with Jönköpings Södra and made his first team debut in 2004 and in 2006 he made his debut in the proffesional divisions in Sweden.

In November 2022, he ended his 23-year old visit at the club.

References

External links 
 

1988 births
Living people
Swedish footballers
Allsvenskan players
Superettan players
Jönköpings Södra IF players
Association football midfielders
People from Jönköping
Sportspeople from Jönköping County